Tomislav Mrčela (born 1 October 1990) is an Australian professional footballer who plays as a defender for Western Sydney Wanderers.

Club career

Mrcela left Australia at a young age and joined the youth academy of Dalmatian side RNK Split. He left Split in 2009 to join Jadran Kaštel, a third division side at the time, and later signed for NK Primorac 1929 in 2010.

In mid 2011, Tomislav joined NK Imotski. Despite being just 20 years of age, Mrcela was immediately a starter. Missing just one game all season, Mrcela made 29 appearances and scored a further three goals. Mrcela continued his good form into the next season and missed just one further game by January 2013. His good form led to a move to fellow second division side NK Mosor where he played out the remainder of the 2012–13 season.

After good performances at Mosor, he moved to top division side NK Hrvatski Dragovoljac. Initially Mrcela struggled, making just four appearances in the first twelve rounds but then became a mainstay in the starting XI. Unfortunately his side were relegated by the end of the season but Mrcela did enough to convince ambitious Zagreb side NK Lokomotiva to keep him in the first division by signing him on a four-year deal

Mrcela scored his first goal for Lokomotiva on debut in a 5–2 loss against HNK Hajduk Split.

On 28 June 2016, Mrcela transferred to South Korean club Jeonnam Dragons.

On 14 June 2018, Mrcela left Jeonnam Dragons to join Australian A-League club Perth Glory on a two-year deal. During his stay at the club, he won the A-League and contributed massively to the team's success.

On 14 September 2021, Mrcela joined Indian Super League club SC East Bengal on a one-year deal. He scored his first goal for the club on 12 December in a 1–1 draw against Kerala Blasters. He was later replaced by Nepali defender Ananta Tamang as their sole AFC Quota.

On 17 February 2022, he moved back to Australia signing with Western Sydney Wanderers until the end of the 2021–22 A-League Men season as an injury replacement player for captain Rhys Williams. After making 12 appearances, Mrcela signed a two-year contract extension with the club.

International career
Holding dual citizenship, Mrcela is eligible to play for either Croatia or Australia. On 10 June 2015, he was named in a 23-man squad for Australia before two 2018 FIFA World Cup qualifying matches against Kyrgyzstan.

Career statistics

Club

Honours
Perth Glory
 A-League Premiers: 2018–19

References

External links
 
 

1990 births
Living people
Soccer players from Perth, Western Australia
Australian people of Croatian descent
Association football central defenders
Australian soccer players
Croatian footballers
NK Primorac 1929 players
NK Imotski players
RNK Split players
NK Mosor players
NK Hrvatski Dragovoljac players
NK Lokomotiva Zagreb players
Jeonnam Dragons players
Perth Glory FC players
East Bengal Club players
Western Sydney Wanderers FC players
First Football League (Croatia) players
Croatian Football League players
K League 1 players
A-League Men players
Indian Super League players
Croatian expatriate footballers
Australian expatriate soccer players
Expatriate footballers in South Korea
Croatian expatriate sportspeople in South Korea
Australian expatriate sportspeople in South Korea
Expatriate footballers in India
Croatian expatriate sportspeople in India
Australian expatriate sportspeople in India